Landkjenning is the second full-length album by the Norwegian folk rock band Glittertind, released on May 27, 2009 through Napalm Records. All instruments and vocals were done by Torbjørn Sandvik and Geirmund Simonsen except the following instruments handled by session members: Harding fiddle by Erlend Viken, flutes by Stefan Theofilakis and cello by Kaja Fjellberg Pettersen. The cover-artwork was done by Kris Verwimp and the cover-layout by Julien Riesen.

This album entered the domestic chart result in Norway on position #20. The song Går min eigen veg was listed in Norway's most popular radio channel  NRK P1.

The songs of the album have been compared to the music of Falkenbach and Fiddler's Green.

Concept of the album
In the beginning of the album booklet, an English statement explains the concept of Landkjenning.
Glittertind utilizes the conflict between Christianity and Norse religion thousand years ago as an entrance in understanding the dehumanizing nature of the clash between ideologies in general. They underscore that benign motives do not necessarily lead to benign actions:

There is some sort of perspectivism in their message, and they don't appear to conclude on the issue of the Christianization of Norway in their statement. Instead, they appear to both take the Christian and Norse viewpoints into an account and end up just posing open questions:

In addition to the enlightenment of the Christianization from two viewpoints, they wish to re-arrange old folk songs and see it as a mission to defeat the forgetting of these songs:

Track listing

References

Glittertind (band) albums
2009 albums
Napalm Records albums